Taques Creek is a tributary of the Susquehanna River in Wyoming County, Pennsylvania, in the United States. The creek is not designated as an impaired waterbody and has no named tributaries. Its watershed is designated as a Coldwater Fishery and a Migratory Fishery.

Course
Taques Creek begins in a valley in Washington Township to the southeast of Yahmer Hill and to the southwest of Valentine Hill. It flows south for several tenths of a mile before reaching the border between Washington Township and Tunkhannock Township, where it continues to flow south. After several tenths of a mile, the creek crosses US Route 6 and receives two unnamed tributaries (one from the left and one from the right. It then turns south-southeast for several tenths of a mile before turning south-southwest. After several tenths of a mile, the creek reaches the end of its valley, crosses a railroad, and reaches its confluence with the Susquehanna River.

Hydrology, geography, and geology

The surficial geology near the mouth of Taques Creek mainly consists of a till known as Wisconsinan Till and bedrock consisting of sandstone and shale, though there is some fill and alluvium at the mouth. Further upstream, the surficial geology along the creek itself mainly consists of alluvium, though most of the rest of the valley is Wisconsinan Till. However, there are patches of fill and alluvial terrace, as well as a few small lakes near the headwaters.

Taques Creek is not designated as an impaired waterbody.

Watershed and biology
The creek is entirely within the United States Geological Survey quadrangle of Tunkhannock. Its mouth is located near Tunkhannock.

The drainage basin of Taques Creek is designated as a Coldwater Fishery and a Migratory Fishery. The designated use for the creek is aquatic life.

History
Taques Creek was entered into the Geographic Names Information System on August 2, 1979. Its identifier in the Geographic Names Information System is 1189269.

Frac fluid was once reported to have been illegally discharged into a drainage ditch in the watershed of Taques Creek. A facility known as Tyler Memorial Hospital received a permit in 2013 to discharge treated sewage into an unnamed tributary of the creek. The permit will expire in October 2018.

In 2013, bids were sought for a bridge rehabilitation project involving a bridge carrying T-518 over Taques Creek.

See also
Tunkhannock Creek (Susquehanna River), next tributary of the Susquehanna River going downstream
Mehoopany Creek, next tributary of the Susquehanna River going upstream
List of rivers of Pennsylvania

References

Rivers of Wyoming County, Pennsylvania
Tributaries of the Susquehanna River
Rivers of Pennsylvania